Aglaia chittagonga is a species of plant in the family Meliaceae. It is found in Bangladesh, Taiwan, and Thailand.

References

chittagonga
Vulnerable plants
Taxonomy articles created by Polbot